Feng Zhi'an (16 December 1896 – 16 December 1954) was a Chinese Nationalist Lieutenant-General during the Second Sino-Japanese War, and Chinese Civil War from Hebei.

From 1931 to 1937, he was the general commanding 37th Division and in 1936 was made 
Chairman of the Government of Hebei Province which office he held until 1938. For a time, he was acting commander of the 29th Army in 1937. Following the Battle of Beiping-Tianjin he organized and commanded the 77th Corps until 1943. Shortly afterward, he became commander of the 19th Army and fought in the Tianjin–Pukou Railway Operation, Battle of Xuzhou and Battle of Wuhan. 
Later as 77th Corps commander he was also in Battle of Suixian-Zaoyang, 1939-40 Winter Offensive and Battle of Zaoyang-Yichang.

In 1940, he was made Commander in Chief of the 33rd Army Group which he commanded in the Central Hebei Operation, Battle of South Henan, and the Western Hebei Operation.

In 1945, he was Commander in Chief Northern Hebei Right Force in the Battle of West Henan-North Hubei.

In 1948, he was a deputy commander of the General Suppression Headquarters of Xuzhou Garrison during the Huaihai Campaign.

References
 Hsu Long-hsuen and Chang Ming-kai, History of The Sino-Japanese War (1937-1945) 2nd Ed., 1971. Translated by Wen Ha-hsiung, Chung Wu Publishing; 33, 140th Lane, Tung-hwa Street, Taipei, Taiwan Republic of China.
Biography of Feng Zhi'an

1896 births
1954 deaths
Chinese people of World War II
National Revolutionary Army generals from Hebei
People from Hengshui